Hipposudoric acid is a red pigment found in the skin secretions of the hippopotamus; although the secretions are often known as "blood sweat" (thus the name "hipposudoric", referring to "hippo sweat"), they are neither blood nor sweat.

Like its orange-colored analog norhipposudoric acid, hipposudoric acid functions both as a natural sunscreen and as an antimicrobial agent. It is derived from the oxidative dimerization of homogentisic acid.

It has been both widely and falsely reported that hipposudoric acid colors hippo milk pink. This is not the case; hippo milk is white or beige in color.

References

Hippopotamuses
Fluorenones
Phenols
Acetic acids
Quinones
Vinylogous carboxylic acids